Diminas Dagogo is a film director from Rivers State, Nigeria best known for his makeup and special effects work on Nollywood films. He has received two AMVCA nominations for his work on Stigma (2013), which starred Hilda Dokubo.

Dagogo is an alumnus of the University of Port Harcourt and lives currently in Berlin/Germany.

Selected filmography
 Bottle Neck (1996)
 Shame (1996)
 Ritual (1997)
 Oracle (1998)
 Stigma (2013)
 Asawana (2016)

See also
 List of Nigerian film directors

References

Film directors from Rivers State
Living people
University of Port Harcourt alumni
Special effects people
Year of birth missing (living people)
Nigerian entertainment industry businesspeople
Nigerian film directors
People from Rivers State